William Maurice "Doc" Ewing (May 12, 1906 – May 4, 1974) was an American geophysicist and oceanographer.

Ewing has been described as a pioneering geophysicist who worked on the research of seismic reflection and refraction in ocean basins, ocean bottom photography, submarine sound transmission (including the SOFAR channel), deep sea Core samples of the ocean bottom, theory and observation of earthquake surface waves, fluidity of the Earth's core, generation and propagation of microseisms, submarine explosion seismology, marine gravity surveys, bathymetry and sedimentation, natural radioactivity of ocean waters and sediments, study of abyssal plains and submarine canyons.

Biography
He was born in Lockney, Texas, where he was the eldest surviving child of a large farm family. He won a scholarship to attend Rice University, earning a BA with honors in 1926. He completed his graduate studies at the same institution, earning an MA in 1927 and being awarded his PhD in 1931. In 1928 he was married to Avarilla Hildenbrand, and the couple had a son. The couple divorced in 1941.

Ewing worked as an instructor at the Rice Institute while pursuing his PhD before joining the faculty at Lehigh University in 1930, where he served until 1944. While at Lehigh, he was instrumental in initiating a program in geophysics. In 1944 he married Margaret Sloan Kidder, with whom he had four children.

He moved to Columbia University, becoming a professor of geology in 1947. In 1959 he was named the Higgins Professor of Geology at Columbia. Dr. Ewing (often simply called 'Doc' by those who worked with him) was the founder (established in 1949) and first director of Lamont Geological Observatory (now known as Lamont–Doherty Earth Observatory (LDEO) in Palisades, New York) where he worked with J. Lamar Worzel (gravity specialist), Dr. Frank Press (seismologist), Jack Nafe, Jack Oliver, and geologists and oceanographic cartographers Dr. Bruce Heezen and Marie Tharp.

The former LDEO research vessel R/V Maurice Ewing was named in his honor.

He divorced a second time, and married his third wife Harriet Greene Bassett in 1965. In 1972 he joined the University of Texas Medical Branch at Galveston, and was named the head of the Division of Earth and Planetary Sciences of the Marine Biomedical Institute.

During his career he published over 340 scientific papers. He served as president of the American Geophysical Union and the Seismological Society of America. He led over 50 oceanic expeditions. He made many contributions to oceanography, including the discovery of the SOFAR Channel, the invention of the sofar bomb, and did much fundamental work on plate tectonics. While he was working on SOFAR, Ewing engaged in deep water photography, partly as a hobby and partly to help the government identify lost ships destroyed by U-boats. He was the chief scientist on board the Glomar Challenger. He originated Project Mogul, an early program to detect Soviet nuclear weapons tests.

Ewing suffered a fatal stroke in 1974 in Galveston, Texas.

Awards and honors
 Penrose Medal, 1974 (posthumously)
 Walter H. Bucher Medal, 1974
 William Bowie Medal, 1957
 Arthur L. Day Medal, 1949
 John J. Carty Award of  the National Academy of Sciences, 1963
 Navy Distinguished Public Service Award, 1955
 Sidney Powers Memorial Medal, 1968
 Robert Earl McConnell Award, 1973
 National Medal of Science, 1973
 Vega Medal of the Swedish Society for Anthropology and Geography, 1965
Cullum Geographical Medal of the American Geographical Society, 1961
 Gold Medal of the Royal Astronomical Society, 1964
 Elected to the National Academy of Sciences, 1948
 Elected a Foreign Member of the Royal Netherlands Academy of Arts and Sciences, 1956
 Elected a Foreign Member of the Royal Society (1972)
 Elected a Fellow of the American Association for the Advancement of Science, 1938
 Elected a Fellow of the American Physical Society, 1938
 Elected to the American Academy of Arts and Sciences, 1951
 Elected to the American Philosophical Society, 1959
 Foreign Member of the Geological Society of London, 1964
 Guggenheim Fellow, 1938, 1953, 1955
 Vetlesen Prize, 1960
 Eleven honorary degrees
 Geophysics Laboratory at the University of Texas Medical Branch Marine Science Institute was renamed Maurice Ewing Hall.
 The Maurice Ewing Medals of the Society of Exploration Geophysicists and American Geophysical Union were named after him.
 The lunar wrinkle ridge Dorsa Ewing was named after him.

See also
List of geophysicists
Research Vessel Maurice Ewing

References

External links
Photo
Video Lecture Explaining SOFAR Spheres
National Academy of Sciences Biographical Memoir
Article regarding Ewing's work with William Donn on Ice Ages
Maurice Ewing, Earth Scientist, Dies
A Theory of Ice Ages, Maurice Ewing and William L. Donn
SOSUS system monitorowania i kontroli dźwięku pod wodą w czasie Zimnej Wojny. cz. 1, www.okretypodwodne.edu.pl (pl)
SOSUS system monitorowania i kontroli dźwięku pod wodą w czasie Zimnej Wojny. cz. 2, www.okretypodwodne.edu.pl (pl)
SOSUS system monitorowania i kontroli dźwięku pod wodą w czasie Zimnej Wojny. cz. 3, www.okretypodwodne.edu.pl (pl)

1906 births
1974 deaths
People from Lockney, Texas
American geophysicists
American seismologists
Penrose Medal winners
National Medal of Science laureates
Columbia University faculty
Lehigh University faculty
Lamont–Doherty Earth Observatory people
Foreign Members of the Royal Society
Rice University alumni
People from Galveston, Texas
Wollaston Medal winners
Members of the Royal Netherlands Academy of Arts and Sciences
Members of the United States National Academy of Sciences
Fellows of the American Academy of Arts and Sciences
Recipients of the Gold Medal of the Royal Astronomical Society
Recipients of the Cullum Geographical Medal
Fellows of the American Physical Society
Marine geophysicists